The 2021 Charleston Southern Buccaneers football team represented Charleston Southern University as a member of the Big South Conference during the 2021 NCAA Division I FCS football season. Led by third-year head coach Autry Denson, the Buccaneers compiled an overall record of 4–6 with a mark of 3–4 in conference play, placing in a fourth-way tie for third in the Big South. Charleston Southern played home games at Buccaneer Field in Charleston, South Carolina.

Schedule

References

Charleston Southern
Charleston Southern Buccaneers football seasons
Charleston Southern Buccaneers football